Sardarmal Lalwani was born on 5 October 1910 in Bhopal state to an Oswal Jain family. His father was the Treasurer (Khajanchi) of Bhopal and also involved in agriculture.

Lalwani died on 4 January 2004 and was survived by his wife, Mohna, and children.

The Lalwani family 
The main branch of the Lalwani Family are descendants of Rai Seth Poonamchand whose father Hiralal had migrated from Merta, Rajasthan, to Bhopal in the early 1800s. Poonamchand was a money-lender and traded in grains, and he laid the foundation of the family's future businesses. One of his two sons, Rai Seth Moolchand, was the father of Sardarmal.

Early life 
Sardarmal Lalwani studied at the Christian College, Indore, affiliated to the Allahabad University.

Career 
Lalwani brought the first colour-printing press, imported from Germany, to the state. He ran a printing business called Lalwani Litho and Typework Pvt. Ltd. from 1942 and the road on which the press was founded is now known as the Lalwani Press Road. In 1944, he also founded the Bhopal Construction Company Ltd, which was commissioned for numerous government and private works, including the laying of railway tracks.

Lalwani cultivated the Sarbati wheat and was a pioneer in bringing mechanised agriculture to the state. He also worked as a grain merchant and had a flour mill. Other businesses included money-lending, rum bottling, and the import and trade of foreign goods. In addition, he founded India Film Corporation Ltd. and was the first film-maker from Bhopal. His productions included Nai Reet (1948), starring Geetabali, Sulochna and Rajindar.

Political career 
Lalwani was a member of the first Legislative Assembly of the Jan Sangh from 1952 to 1957 in Madhya Bharat. He was also an Honorary Magistrate of the erstwhile state of Bhopal and, in 1942, a member of the Municipal Corporation. During World War II he was in charge of a protection force in Bhopal, for which work he was awarded a medal.

In 1975, Lalwani was president of the state unit of the Rashtriya Swayamsevak Sangh (RSS) and was targeted by the Government of India during The Emergency. This did not deter him from remaining a staunch RSS loyalist. He was a good friend of Shankar Dayal Sharma, the ninth President of India, and of Atal Bihari Vajpayee, who was the tenth Prime Minister of India. He was also closely associated with Prakash Chandra Sethi, Virendra Kumar Saklecha, and Sunderlal Patwa, all of whom were Chief Ministers of Madhya Pradesh.

Social outreach 
Lalwani held many posts in public life. He was the President of the Rotary Club in 1945 and of the Lions Club. As Founder President of the Bal Niketan Orphanage, he established the roots of an organisation benefiting orphans and children of jail inmates. He was also the President of the Grain Merchants Association and the Krishi Upaj Mandi Samiti, Chairman of Smt. Bishenjibai Kanstiya Trust, President Ratanbai Jain Mehnaut Trust, President, Bhopal Gaushala Association, President, Bhopal Tehwaar Sabha, and Founder President of Shri Jain Shwetamber Vidhya Mandir which runs a school in Lalwani Lane. He was elected President of Shri Jain Shwetambar Murti Pujak Sangh Trust for two tenures and also the President of Bhopal Jain Samaj.

Farmers' rights 
Lalwani successfully fought a Public Interest Litigation on behalf of the farmers of the village of Jamonia Chhir against the Government of India. Upon winning the case in the Supreme Court of India, the farmers were awarded fair compensation for land which was declared to be under submergence by the Government.

References 

1910 births
2004 deaths
20th-century Indian Jains
Madhya Pradesh politicians
Politicians from Bhopal
Madhya Bharat politicians
20th-century Indian politicians